Moreno Ferrario (born 20 March 1959) is an Italian professional football coach and a former player from Lainate in the Metropolitan City of Milan.

He played as a sweeper or centre-back for Napoli, where he spent over a decade; he is the club's third highest appearance holder of all time.

In the earlier part of his career, he appeared for the Italy national under-21 football team.

Honours
Napoli
 Serie A: 1986–87
 Coppa Italia: 1986–87

References

1959 births
Living people
Italian footballers
Italy under-21 international footballers
Italy youth international footballers
Serie A players
Serie B players
Serie C players
S.S.D. Varese Calcio players
S.S.C. Napoli players
A.S. Roma players
U.S. Avellino 1912 players
A.C.N. Siena 1904 players
Carrarese Calcio players
Italian football managers
Association football defenders